Zsuzsa Nyertes (born Zsuzsanna Nyertes 14 December 1958, Budapest) is a Hungarian actress.

Life
In 1983, she graduated from the Academy of Drama and Film in Budapest and was a member of the Vidám Színpad. She has a diverse repertoire of performances, from cabaret to comedy to musicals. She also took part in television broadcasts as well. She married and had a daughter born in 1993. She currently owns a beauty salon and regularly writes poems, and published a book of poems. At the age of 42, she was featured in Playboy as a Marilyn Monroe look-alike. She regularly features in game and fashion shows.

Awards
 The Knight's Cross of the Hungarian Order of Merit (2009)
 Pepita Különdíj (2014)
 Nagy Miklós Vándor-díj (2015)

Filmography

Feature films
Szegény Dzsoni és Árnika (1983)
István, a király (1984)
 Nyitott ablak (1988)
Amerikából jöttem... (1989)
Hamis a baba (1991)
A három testőr Afrikában (1996)
Érzékek iskolája (1996)
Egy hét Pesten és Budán (2003)

Television film
Tizenhat város tizenhat lánya (1979)
Reggelire legjobb a puliszka (1983)
Mint oldott kéve 1–7. (1983)
Csodatopán (1984)
Linda (1984–1989)
Kaviár és lencse (1985)
A kaméliás hölgy (1986)
Az angol királynő (1988)
Napóleon (1989)
Polizeiruf 110: Der Tod des Pelikan (1990)
Família Kft. (1991)
Űrgammák (1995)
Barátok közt (2001)

Entertainment
Új Gálvölgyi-show (1991–1992)
Gálvölgyi szubjektív (1994)
Kern András-bohózatok
Színésznők a kifutón
Gálvölgyi-show (2005–2007)
Best of 50 Gálvölgyi
Kabarémúzeum (2006)

Syncing
Flug des Falken (1985)
Spinédzserek (1996–1999)
Titkolt titkos ügynök (1991)

CDs and audiobooks
Little Red Riding Hood and other Grimm Tales

References

External links
 Magyar színházművészeti lexikon.Főszerk. Székely György. Budapest: Akadémiai. 1994.  Online elérés
 Nyertes Zsuzsa in PORT.hu-n

1958 births
Living people
Hungarian voice actresses
21st-century Hungarian actresses
20th-century Hungarian actresses
Actresses from Budapest